The Florida Association of Stock Car Automobile Racing (FASCAR) was considered to be the Florida state version of the National Association for Stock Car Automobile Racing or simply NASCAR for short. It was intended to be a developmental league where 14+-year old drivers develop their skills on stock cars to prepare for racing at the local level as well as higher divisions. Operating since the 1970s, series under the FASCAR umbrella have operated on three race tracks: Lake City Speedway (1/2 mile), New Smyrna Speedway (1/2 mile), and Orlando Speedworld (3/8 mile). FASCAR became defunct in 2013 when New Smyrna Speedway signed a deal to become a NASCAR Home Track.

External links
FASCAR official website

Stock car racing series in the United States
Motorsport in Florida